Wibberley may refer to:

 Brian Wibberley (1866–1944), Australian Methodist minister
 Cormac and Marianne Wibberley, American husband and wife screenwriting team known as The Wibberleys
 Gerald Wibberley (1915–1991), British agricultural economist
 Leonard Wibberley (1915–1983), Irish novelist— The Mouse that Roared
 Marcus Wibberley (born 1981), British organist
 Mary Wibberley (died 2013), English romantic fiction writer

See also
 Wimberley, a town in Texas, U.S.